Pigres may refer to:

Pigres of Halicarnassus  first ancient Greek poet, who introduced the iambic trimeter.
Pigres of Caria naval commander of Xerxes
Pigres of Paionia deported in Anatolia by Darius